Lee Charles Norwood (born February 2, 1960) is an American former professional ice hockey defenceman. He played 12 seasons in the National Hockey League for seven different teams between 1980 and 1994.

Playing career
Norwood was drafted 62nd overall in the 1979 NHL Entry Draft by the Quebec Nordiques. During his 12-year NHL career, he played for the Nordiques, Washington Capitals, St. Louis Blues, Detroit Red Wings, New Jersey Devils, Hartford Whalers, and Calgary Flames. After his stint with the Flames, he retired from professional play in 1994, only to return to active play a year later in the International Hockey League for two seasons before retiring for a second and final time. Norwood was awarded the Governor's Trophy at the end of the 1984-85 IHL season for being the most outstanding defenseman in the league.

In 503 NHL games, Norwood had 58 goals, 153 assists, and 1,099 penalty minutes. He served as the head coach of the Eastern Michigan University hockey team but left his position after the 2007–08 season. He currently does work on behalf of the Red Wings Alumni Association.

Career statistics

Regular season and playoffs

References

External links

Profile at hockeydraftcentral.com

1960 births
Living people
Adirondack Red Wings players
American men's ice hockey defensemen
Calgary Flames players
Chicago Wolves players
Detroit Red Wings players
Detroit Vipers players
Fredericton Express players
Hartford Whalers players
Hershey Bears players
Hull Olympiques players
Ice hockey players from Michigan
Ice hockey players from California
New Jersey Devils players
Oshawa Generals players
People from Trenton, Michigan
Peoria Rivermen (IHL) players
Quebec Nordiques draft picks
Quebec Nordiques players
Saginaw Lumber Kings players
San Antonio Dragons players
San Diego Gulls (IHL) players
Sportspeople from Oakland, California
St. Catharines Saints players
St. Louis Blues players
Washington Capitals players